Rhyacionia leptotubula is a species of moth of the family Tortricidae. It is found in Heilongjiang and Yunnan in China.

References

Moths described in 1984
Eucosmini